Chľaba is a village and municipality in the Nové Zámky District in the Nitra Region of south-west Slovakia.

History
In historical records the village was first mentioned in 1138

Geography
The village lies at an altitude of 117 metres and covers an area of 13.866 km². It has a population of about 707 people.

Ethnicity
The population is about 87% Hungarian and 12% Slovak.

Facilities
The village has a public library and a football pitch.

https://web.archive.org/web/20161016170434/http://www.chlabaturism.eu.sk/
https://web.archive.org/web/20071217080336/http://www.statistics.sk/mosmis/eng/run.html
Virtual Tour of Chlaba Wine Cellars, National Cultural Heritage
Official Chlaba Village Web Page (SK/HU)
Chľaba – Nové Zámky Okolie

Genealogical resources

The records for genealogical research are available at the state archive "Statny Archiv in Nitra, Slovakia"

 Roman Catholic church records (births/marriages/deaths): 1839-1895 (parish A)

See also
 List of municipalities and towns in Slovakia

External links
Surnames of living people in Chlaba

Villages and municipalities in Nové Zámky District